Group F of the 2023 UEFA European Under-21 Championship qualifying competition consists of six teams: Italy, Sweden, Republic of Ireland, Bosnia and Herzegovina, Montenegro, and Luxembourg. The composition of the nine groups in the qualifying group stage was decided by the draw held on 28 January 2021, 12:00 CET (UTC+1), at the UEFA headquarters in Nyon, Switzerland, with the teams seeded according to their coefficient ranking.

Standings

Matches
Times are CET/CEST, as listed by UEFA (local times, if different, are in parentheses).

Goalscorers

Notes

References

External links

Group D